Quiéreme siempre (English title: Love me forever) is a Mexican telenovela produced by Ernesto Alonso for Televisa in 1981.

Jacqueline Andere and Juan Luis Gallardo starred as protagonists, while Úrsula Prats, Nubia Martí, Víctor Junco and Liza Willert starred as antagonists.

Cast 
Jacqueline Andere as Ana Maria Ponce de Leon
Victoria Ruffo as Julia
Gabriela Ruffo as Evelina
Juan Luis Gallardo as Alberto
Jorge Vargas as Guillermo
Nubia Martí as Isabel
Úrsula Prats as Giuliana Murat
Víctor Junco as Don Felipe
Eduardo Yáñez as Carlos
Liza Willert as Gudelia
Enrique del Castillo as Lorenzo
Rosita Bouchot as Juventina
Carlos Riquelme as Ramon
Nerina Ferrer as Emma
Josefina Escobedo as Doña Luz
Hector Gomez as Maestro Liberman
Agustin Sauret as Chavez
Servando Manzetti
Antonio Medellín
Martin Lasalle
Fortino Salazar

References

External links 

Mexican telenovelas
1981 telenovelas
Televisa telenovelas
Spanish-language telenovelas
1981 Mexican television series debuts
1982 Mexican television series endings